This is a comprehensive discography of Vanessa-Mae, a Singaporean-born British violinist.

Studio albums

EPs

Compilation albums

Singles

Other appearances

References

Classical music discographies
Pop music discographies
Discographies of British artists